Mont Cenis is a massif (el. 3,612 m / 11,850 ft at Pointe de Ronce) and a pass (el. 2,085 m / 6,840 ft) in Savoie (France), which forms the limit between the Cottian and Graian Alps.

Route

The term "Mont Cenis" could derive from mont des cendres ("mountain of ashes"). According to tradition, following a forest fire, a great quantity of ashes accumulated on the ground, thus the name. The path of ashes was found during the building work of the route.

The pass connects Val-Cenis in France in the northwest with Susa in Italy in the southeast. Thence the valley of the Dora Riparia is followed to Turin (103.8 km / 64.5 mi from Modane). The carriage road mounts the Arc valley for 25.7 km / 16 mi from Modane to Lanslebourg, whence it is 12.9 km / 8 mi to the hospice, a little way beyond the summit of the pass. The descent lies through the Cenis valley to Susa (49.9 km / 37 mi from Modane) where the road joins the railway.

To the southwest of the Mont Cenis is the Little Mont Cenis (2184.2 m / 7166 ft) which leads from the summit plateau (in Italy) of the main pass to the Etache valley on the French slope and so to Bramans in the Arc valley.

The pass runs parallel to the Fréjus Rail Tunnel. This (highest point 1295 m / 4249 ft) is really 27.4 km 17 miles southwest of the pass, below the Col du Fréjus. From Chambéry the line runs up the Isère valley, but soon bears through that of the Arc or the Maurienne past Saint-Jean-de-Maurienne to Modane (98.2 km / 61 mi from Chambéry). The tunnel is 13 km in length, and leads to Bardonecchia, some way below which, at Oulx the line joins the road from the Col de Montgenèvre.

History
In the Middle Ages, pilgrims passing through Moncenisio and Susa Valley came to Turin along a road called the Via Francigena, with a final destination of Rome. In 1414, Niccolò III d'Este, Marquis of Ferrara travelled on this route returning from Paris having met Charles VI, and described the Col du Mont Cenis as having "a good ascent and bad descent". This pass was crossed in 1689 by the Vaudois, and is believed by some authors to have been the pass used by Hannibal to cross the Alps.

As an Alpine pass, Mont Cenis featured in several historical incidents. One example is the descent of Constantine I to Italy, to fight against Maxentius. It was the site of a military victory by the French Army of the Alps, led by General-in-Chief Alex Dumas over Piedmontese forces in April 1794, a victory that enabled the French Army of Italy to invade and conquer the Italian peninsula. It was the principal route for crossing the Alps between France and Italy until the 19th century. It was also used as the main passage by which Charlemagne crossed with his army to invade Lombardy in 773, and later by Napoleon I.

Mont Cenis was one of the most used Alpine passes from the Middle Ages to the nineteenth century. The pass was part of the border between the two countries from the annexation of Savoy to the Second French Empire in 1861 until the 1947 Treaty of Paris, but is now located completely in France. The treaty allowed Savoy to retrieve its historical and political boundaries. It has historically been part of Route nationale 6.

A road over the pass was built between 1802 and 1805 by Napoleon to improve military connections. By 1810, it was the most travelled road between France and Italy, as Strasbourg was closed to silk trade traffic  from Vienna, leading to Lyon becoming a major trade centre instead. The Mont Cenis Pass Railway was opened alongside the road in 1868, but was dismantled in 1871, on the opening of the Fréjus Rail Tunnel. It was the first ever railway based on the Fell mountain railway system and was worked by English engine-drivers. The Fréjus Rail Tunnel acquired the alternative, and geographically incorrect, name of Mont Cenis Tunnel because the traffic which formerly used the Mont Cenis Pass was transferred to it.

When the Kingdom of Sardinia-Piedmont ceded Savoy to France, in 1860, the Mont Cenis became a frontier pass, and consequently a part of Savoy was left on the Italian side. It was therefore highly fortified as a protection against an invasion of the Val di Susa route towards Turin. In 1874-1880 the Italian Regio Esercito built three stone forts: Fort Cassa, Fort Varisello and Fort Roncia, supported by several batteries and fortifications, such as those at top of Mont Malamot. Two further armored batteries, La Court and Paradiso, were added in the early 20th century, while the Fascist government built here part of its underground Alpine Wall. All these fortifications are now in French territory after the boundaries revision in 1947 allowing Savoy to get its historical territory back.

The Lac Du Mont Cenis is an artificial dam that was constructed in 1921 on top of the original road and border crossing. It feeds two hydroelectric power plants. The lake is occasionally drained for maintenance.

Cycling
The pass of Mont Cenis has been featured 5 times in the Tour de France. It has been classified hors-catégorie (yielding the highest number of points in the King-of-the-Mountains classification) since 1999. For the 5 years that the pass was on the Tour, the following cyclists have crossed the pass in the lead:

 1949 - Giuseppe Tacca, France
 1956 - Federico Bahamontes, Spain
 1961 - Emmanuel Busto, France
 1992 - Claudio Chiappucci, Italy
 1999 - Dimitri Konyshev, Russia

In the 2013 Giro d'Italia, the pass was featured in the 15th stage on May 19, 2013.

Climate

Mont Cenis has a subarctic climate (Köppen climate classification Dfc). Even the warmest months of July and August, the temperature rarely rises above , and often falls below minus  in severe winter. Around the world, there are also Zoige and Litang areas with similar climatic characteristics here.

Points of interest 
 Jardin botanique de Mont Cenis, an alpine botanical garden

See also
 List of highest paved roads in Europe
 List of mountain passes

Notes

References

External links 
 
 Profile on climbbybike.com
 Both Sides: Cycling Map, Profile, and Photos
 Géologie aux alentours du col du Mont-Cenis 
 Montcenis 
 Comment en 1812 le pape Pie VII faillit mourir à l'hospice du Mont-Cenis. 
 Chemin de Fer du Mont-Cenis 
 Lac du Mont-Cenis 
 Col du Petit Mont-Cenis 
 Mont Cenis on Google Maps (Tour de France classic climbs)

Mountain passes of Auvergne-Rhône-Alpes
Mountain passes of the Alps
Mountains of Savoie
France–Italy border crossings